Amber McLaughlin (January 13, 1973 – January 3, 2023) was an American transgender woman executed in Missouri for the 2003 rape and murder of her ex-girlfriend, Beverly Guenther. At the time of the crime, McLaughlin was living as male, transitioning from male to female while incarcerated. She thus became the first openly transgender person to be executed in the United States. McLaughlin's legal name remained her birth name, Scott A. McLaughlin, and was identified as such in her death warrant and in prison records.

McLaughlin was a registered sex offender, due to a 1992 conviction for sexual assault against a 14 year old girl.

At McLaughlin's 2006 trial, the jury deadlocked on the issue of the death penalty. In most U.S. states, this would result in a sentence of life imprisonment. However, Missouri is one of only two states (the other being Indiana) in which a judge has the discretion to sentence a defendant to death if the jury deadlocks on the issue of capital punishment.

In August 2021, McLaughlin's sentence was reinstated by the United States Court of Appeals for the Eighth Circuit.

See also 
 Capital punishment in Missouri
 List of people executed in Missouri
 List of people executed in the United States in 2023
 List of women executed in the United States since 1976

References 

1973 births
2023 deaths
21st-century executions by Missouri
21st-century executions of American people
American female murderers
American people executed for murder
Executed American women
People convicted of murder by Missouri
People executed by Missouri by lethal injection
Transgender women